The Shabla Lighthouse is a lighthouse located 5 kilometres east of the town of Shabla, Dobrich Province; in Bulgaria. The lighthouse was built in 1856 by the Ottoman Empire and is the oldest lighthouse in Bulgaria. The lighthouse is located at the easternmost point of Bulgaria.

See also
 List of lighthouses in Bulgaria

References

Lighthouses completed in 1856
Resort architecture in Bulgaria
Lighthouses in Bulgaria